Charles Wilda, originally Karl (20 December 1854, Vienna – 11 June 1907, Vienna) was an Austrian Orientalist painter. He was the elder brother of the painter, .

Biography 
He studied with Leopold Carl Müller at the Academy of Fine Arts Vienna. It was Müller who first introduced him to Orientalist painting, having himself acquired that interest from Eugène Fromentin in Paris. In 1903, the Viennese art critic, Ludwig Hevesi, declared Wilda to be Müller's true successor.

He often stayed in Cairo for extended periods, and scenes of the daily street life there compose the bulk of his works. In 1892, he undertook a journey through North Africa with his friend, the sculptor  , which provided additional inspiration.

Beginning in the 1880s, he was a regular exhibitor at events in Vienna, Berlin, Munich and Dresden. He was also represented by several works at the Exposition Universelle (1900).

Two of his paintings were acquired for the Imperial Collection of Kaiser Franz Joseph I.

Following his death, the Vienna Künstlerhaus honored him at their Autumn Exposition with over fifty of his oil paintings being featured. He was interred at the Wiener Zentralfriedhof. His grave is  adorned with a monument created in 1909 by Hella Unger (1875-1932).

Selected paintings

References

Further reading 
 Katalog Herbstausstellung und Gedächtnisausstellung Charles Wilda : Wien, 10. November 1907 im Künstlerhause. (exhibition catalog), Verlag der Genossenschaft der bildenden Künstler Wiens, 1907.
 Herbert Zemen: Der Orientmaler Charles Wilda, 1854-1907. Materialien zur Biographie. Self-published, Vienna 2012 WorldCat

External links 

More works by Wilda @ ArtNet

Austrian male painters
Academy of Fine Arts Vienna alumni
Artists from Vienna
1854 births
1907 deaths
19th-century Austrian painters
19th-century Austrian male artists
20th-century Austrian painters
20th-century Austrian male artists